This article contains information about the literary events and publications of 1806.

Events
 July – Following publication of Irish-born poet Thomas Moore's Epistles, Odes, and Other Poems, Francis Jeffrey denounces it in this month's Edinburgh Review as "licentious". Moore challenges Jeffrey to a duel in London but their confrontation is interrupted by officials and they become friends.
November 23 – Sir Roger Newdigate dies, leaving a bequest that funds the foundation of the Newdigate Prize for English Poetry at the University of Oxford. The first winner is John Wilson ("Christopher North").
December 29 – Thomas Dibdin's pantomime Harlequin and Mother Goose; or, The Golden Egg opens at the Covent Garden Theatre in London starring Joseph Grimaldi. It runs for 111 performances.
unknown dates
Noah Webster publishes his first English dictionary, A Compendious Dictionary of the English Language, recording distinct American spellings.
Johann Wolfgang von Goethe completes a preliminary version of his Faust.
Nólsoyar Páll completes his anti-Danish Fuglakvæði (Ballad of the Birds), one of the first significant works in the Faroese language.

New books

Fiction
Harriet Butler – Vensenshon
Sophie Ristaud Cottin – Elisabeth, ou les Exilés de Sibérie
Catherine Cuthbertson – Santo Sebastiano
Charlotte Dacre – Zofloya
Maria Edgeworth – Leonora
Rachel Hunter – Lady Maclairn, the Victim of Villany
Francis Lathom – The Mysterious Freebooter
Matthew Gregory Lewis – Feudal Tyrants
Sydney Owenson – The Wild Irish Girl
Louisa Stanhope – Montbrasil Abbey

Children and young people
Elizabeth Dawbarn – Young Person's Assistant in Reading the Old Testament
Ann Taylor and Jane Taylor – Rhymes for the Nursery

Drama
Richard Cumberland – Hint to Husbands
Thomas Holcroft – The Vindictive Man
Heinrich von Kleist – The Broken Jug (Der zerbrochne Krug, written)
Leandro Fernández de Moratín – The Maidens' Consent (El sí de las niñas, first performed)

Non-fiction
J. C. Adelung – Mithridates, a History of Language and Dialects
Johann Gottlieb Fichte – Bericht über die Wissenschaftslehre
James Madison – An Examination of the British Doctrine which Subjects to Capture a Neutral Trade not Open in Time of Peace
Maria Rundell (as A Lady) – A New System of Domestic Cookery
Jane West – Letters to a Young Lady

Births
January 17 – William Saunders, Welsh poet and printer (died 1851)
February 1 – Jane Williams (Ysgafell), Welsh poet, folklorist and historian (died 1885) 
March 6 – Elizabeth Barrett Browning, English poet (died 1861)
March 26 – James Hogg, Scottish editor and publisher (died 1888)
April 17 – William Gilmore Simms, American author (died 1870)
May 20 – John Stuart Mill, English political economist and philosopher (died 1873)
July 20 – John Sterling, Scottish essayist and poet (died 1844)
July 22 – Johann Kaspar Zeuss, German historian and philologist (died 1856)
August 31 – Charles Lever, Irish novelist (died 1872)
November 11 – Georgiana Chatterton, English novelist and travel writer (died 1876)

Deaths
February 12 – Gabriel-Henri Gaillard, French historian (born 1726)
February 19 – Elizabeth Carter, English poet, writer and translator (born 1717)
February 24 – Collin d'Harleville, French dramatist (born 1755)
March 3 – Heinrich Christian Boie, German poet and editor (born 1744)
April 4 – Carlo Gozzi, Venetian dramatist (born 1720)
May 6 – Ann Yearsley, English poet, writer and library proprietor (died 1753)
October 19 – Henry Kirke White, English poet (born 1785)
October 28 – Charlotte Turner Smith, English poet and novelist (born 1749)
November 23 – Sir Roger Newdigate, English antiquary, politician and literary patron (born 1719)

References

Years of the 19th century in literature